Marta Čakić (born 16 August 1982) is a Croatian former female professional basketball player.

External links
Profile at eurobasket.com

1982 births
Living people
Sportspeople from Drniš
Croatian women's basketball players
Shooting guards
ŽKK Gospić players
ŽKK Šibenik players
Croatian Women's Basketball League players
Mediterranean Games silver medalists for Croatia
Competitors at the 2005 Mediterranean Games
Mediterranean Games bronze medalists for Croatia
Competitors at the 2009 Mediterranean Games
Mediterranean Games medalists in basketball